Kaifeng North railway station is a railway station of Xuzhou–Lanzhou high-speed railway in Longting District, Kaifeng, Henan, China. The station started operation on 10 September 2016, together with the Zhengzhou–Xuzhou section of the railway.

Design
The station building was designed to resemble the architecture style of the Northern Song Dynasty, during which Kaifeng was the capital of China.

Station Layout

The platforms and tracks of the station are elevated on the 2nd level. The station has 2 side platforms and 4 tracks, of which 2 are through tracks for non-stop trains. The two-level station building is to the south of the platforms. The ticket office and VIP lounge are on the first level and the waiting halls are located on both levels.

References

Buildings and structures in Henan
Railway stations in Henan
Stations on the Xuzhou–Lanzhou High-Speed Railway
Railway stations in China opened in 2016
Buildings and structures in Kaifeng